Natural Gas is an album by Canadian jazz rock outfit, Natural Gas. It was their only album. It stayed in the Canadian charts for a period of time in 1970.

Background
Natural Gas' debut album was recorded at RCA studios in Montreal in October, 1969. It was produced by the group's managers, Pat Jaques and Fran White who the group met in March that year. It was also mixed in New York. 
It was released in January, 1970. It was released in the United States some time before it got a Canadian release. It was also a front page pick by music magazines, Record World and Billboard.  

A party was held in January at Broadway Recording Studios for the release of the group's album. It was attended by Gus Gossart, WCBS-FM Program Director, Dick Bozzi, WCBS-FM Music Director, Dan Goldberg, Music Editor of Record World, plus hosts, George and Sam Goldner of Firebird Records. Their song, "What Do You Want From My Life" was also getting attention.  By March, that year, Modern Tape's Promotional Director, John Driscoll was ready to tour the Western Provinces to promote the group's LP album and their single, "All Powerful Man".

Charts
For the week ending March 14th, the album entered the RPM100 albums chart at #82.
For the week ending April 18, 1970 the album was at #66 on the RPM100 albums chart. For the week ending May 16, it was at the #55 spot.

The album also made the Top 50 in the United States.

Release

References

1970 albums